Richview may refer to:

Richview, Illinois
Richview, Toronto, a neighbourhood in Toronto, Ontario, Canada